Jennifer Kay French  (born 1978) is a politician in Ontario, Canada. She is a New Democratic member of the Legislative Assembly of Ontario who was elected in 2014. She represents the riding of Oshawa.

Background
French was born in Winchester, Ontario, near Ottawa. She grew up in the United States after moving there with her family. She returned to Canada to attend Queen's University where she earned a bachelor's degree in biology. She spent three years teaching in Japan before returning to earn a master's degree in science with a teaching specialty. She moved to Oshawa where she spent eight years teaching elementary school.

Politics
French ran in the 2014 provincial election as the New Democratic candidate in the riding of Oshawa. She defeated Progressive Conservative incumbent Jerry Ouellette by 7,695 votes.

She was the party's critic for pension issues, switched to critic for Community Safety and Correctional Services on March 23, 2015, and then to critic of Youth Engagement and critic of Citizenship and Immigration as of December 2, 2016.

She was reelected in the 2018 election.

Electoral record

References

External links

1978 births
Living people
Ontario New Democratic Party MPPs
People from Oshawa
Women MPPs in Ontario
21st-century Canadian politicians
21st-century Canadian women politicians
Queen's University at Kingston alumni
21st-century Canadian educators
Canadian schoolteachers